The girls' foil competition at the 2018 Summer Youth Olympics was held at the Africa Pavilion on 7 October.

Results

Pool round

Pool 1

Pool 2

Bracket

Final standings

References

External links

 Official Fencing Result Book (pdf)
Pool round results 
Ranking after pools 
Bracket 

Fencing at the 2018 Summer Youth Olympics